Flavum is a Latin word meaning "yellow". It is often used in taxonomy for species names typically in scientific names for animals and plants to refer to the flower colour or other aspect of the species.

Animals
 Aeromicrobium flavum, Gram-positive facultatively anaerobic and non-motile bacterium from the genus of Aeromicrobium
 Chryseobacterium flavum, Gram-negative, rod-shaped and non-motile bacteria from the genus of Chryseobacterium
 Etheostoma flavum, (saffron darter) a fish species found in Tennessee
 Gnomibidion flavum, species of beetle in the family Cerambycidae
 Lophopoeum w-flavum, species of beetle in the family Cerambycidae
 Microbacterium flavum, Gram-positive and aerobic bacterium from the genus of Microbacterium
 Punctulum flavum, species of minute sea snail, a marine gastropod mollusk or micromollusk in the family Rissoidae
 Oxalicibacterium flavum, Gram-negative, rod-shaped, non-spore-forming, yellow-pigmented, and oxalotrophic bacterium from the genus Oxalicibacterium
 Spectamen flavum, species of sea snail, a marine gastropod mollusk in the family Solariellidae
 Tragiscoschema cor-flavum, species of beetle in the family Cerambycidae
 Tropidion flavum, species of beetle in the family Cerambycidae

Plants
 Allium flavum, ('Small yellow onion') species of onion native to the lands surrounding the Mediterranean, Black, and Caspian Seas
 Arisaema flavum, (Konso litota or panshalla) species of flowering plant widespread across eastern Africa and southern Asia
 Bulbophyllum flavum, species of orchid in the genus Bulbophyllum
 Conophytum flavum, small South African species of succulent plant of the genus Conophytum
 Cypripedium flavum, (the orchid species yellow cypripedium), endemic to China
 Eriogonum flavum, the alpine golden buckwheat, native to northwestern North America
 Glaucium flavum, (yellow hornpoppy or yellow horned poppy) summer flowering plant in the family Papaveraceae, which is native to Northern Africa, Macaronesia, temperate zones in Western Asia and the Caucasus and Europe
 Hymenosporum flavum, (native frangipani) rainforest tree which is native to Queensland and New South Wales in Australia and New Guinea
 Lepidium flavum, (yellow pepperweed) species of flowering plant in the mustard family, it is native to California, Nevada, and Baja California
 Linum flavum, (the golden flax or yellow flax) species of flowering plant in the family Linaceae, native to central and southern Europe
 Pleopsidium flavum, (gold cobblestone lichen) is a distinctively coloured, bright lemon-yellow to chartreuse crustose lichen
 Prasophyllum flavum, (yellow leek orchid) species of orchid endemic to eastern Australia
 Teucrium flavum, (yellow germander)
 Thalictrum flavum, (common meadow-rue, and yellow meadow-rue) flowering plant species in the family Ranunculaceae
 Zanthoxylum flavum, (noyer, West Indian satinwood, yellow sanders, tembetaria, and yellow sandalwood) medium-sized tree in the citrus family, Rutaceae

See also
 Flava (disambiguation), also meaning yellow or blond in Latin

References